Abasi may refer to:
Afghan abasi, Afghan money
Abasi, Karnataka, a village in India
Tosin Abasi (born 1983), American guitarist

See also
Abassi (disambiguation)
Abbasi (disambiguation)
Ikot Abasi (disambiguation)

Surnames of Georgian origin
Georgian-language surnames